KwaZulu-Natal South Coast (better known as the KZN South Coast or just the South Coast) is a region on the southern coast of KwaZulu-Natal, South Africa. It stretches from Scottburgh in the north to Port Edward in the south and Harding in the west. The coast is governed by the Ugu District Municipality.

Its main towns are Scottburgh, Pennington, Hibberdene, Port Shepstone, Margate, Southbroom and Port Edward however Port Shepstone is the municipal seat and the primary town as it is the powerhouse of the South Coast.

As of 2016 the KwaZulu-Natal South Coast has a population of 753 336 (Ugu District Municipality).

Demographics
As of 2016, the Ugu District Municipality (KZN South Coast) has a population of 753 336 people compared to 2011 where it had a population of 689 051 which indicates that between 2011 and 2016 the population grew at about 8.5%. The annual population growth was 2.03% and the number of men per 100 females decreased from 91.8% in 2011 to 88.4% in 2016.

Geography

It is bordered by the Indian Ocean on the east, East Griqualand in the west, Durban in the north, the KwaZulu-Natal Midlands in the north-west and the Mtamvuna River (border between KZN and Eastern Cape) to the south. The Mtanvuma River is the southernmost border which borders between KwaZulu-Natal and the Eastern Cape.

The coastline between Amanzimtoti and Clansthal is normally regarded part of the South Coast however according to Tourism KZN (government agency for tourism in KwaZulu-Natal), the KwaZulu-Natal South Coast starts officially from Scottburgh in the north to Port Edward in the south.

Administration 

The region is governed by the Ugu District Municipality with its seat in Port Shepstone. The three different regions are administered by their respective local municipalities. The only exception is where the Hibiscus Coast is governed by two local municipalities:

Unfortunately the municipality has not properly maintained sewage lines along the South Coast with the result that many beaches along the South Coast are contaminated and dangerous to swim in. One should enquire about contamination and beach closures prior to traveling to the area and to seek medical treatment immediately upon any signs of diarrhea and vomiting as a result of swimming in these waters.

 Umdoni Coast and Country- uMdoni Local Municipality (seat: Scottburgh) 
 Hibiscus Coast- Ray Nkonyeni Local Municipality (seat: Port Shepstone) & Umzumbe Local Municipality (seat: Mtwalume)
 Harding and Surroundings- uMuziwabantu Local Municipality (seat: Harding)

Subregions 
It is divided into three subregions which are Umdoni Coast & Country, Hibiscus Coast and Harding and surrounds.

Umdoni Coast & Country 

Umdoni Coast and Country better known as the Upper South Coast stretches from Scottburgh to Mtwalume. It is located south of the Greater Durban Metro. Its main town is Scottburgh.

Hibiscus Coast

Hibiscus Coast also known as the Lower South Coast stretches from Hibberdene in the north to Port Edward in the south and Izingolweni in the west. Hibiscus Coast is the ultimate economy booster of the South Coast due its location and as well as being home to the South Coast 's economic hub, Port Shepstone. It is known as the 'beach holiday mecca' of KwaZulu-Natal and is known for its 'unending' Hibiscus trees found along the coast.

Harding and Surrounds 

Harding is a small town located halfway between Port Shepstone and Kokstad in Griqualand East. It is famous for its sawmills in the Weza area and the Ingeli Forest.

Facilities 

The KZN South Coast has eight hospitals.

Public Hospitals
Dunstan Farell Hospital, Hibberdene
 G.J Crookes Hospital, Scottburgh
 Murchsion District Hospital, Murchison, near Port Shepstone
 Port Shepstone Regional Hospital, Port Shepstone 
 St Andrew's Provincial Hospital, Harding

Private Hospitals
 Hibiscus Private Hospital, Port Shepstone 
 Hibiscus Private Hospital, Scottburgh
 Netcare Margate Hospital, Margate
 Shelly Beach Hospital, Shelly Beach

Golfing 

The South Coast has more golf courses than any other section of South Africa; many of them are 18-hole courses and are in the country's top 100 courses. They include:
 Harding Golf Club
 Hibberdene Golf Club
 Margate Country Club
 Port Edward Country Club
 Port Shepstone Country Club
 San Lameer Golf Course, Southbroom
 Scottburgh Golf Club
 Selborne Golf Club, Pennington
 Southbroom Golf Club
 Umdoni Golf Club, Pennington

Tourism 
The coast is rich in terms of attractions and tourism contributes largely to the region's economy.

 Avuxeni Adventures
 Aqua Planet Dive Centre
 Butterfly Valley
 Crocworld Conservation Centre
 Ingeli Forest
 Macbutterflies
 Margate Art Museum
 Margate Main Beach
 Oribi Gorge Nature Reserve
 Port Shepstone Lighthouse
 Port Edward Lighthouse
 Pure Venom
 Red Desert Nature Conservation Area
 Riverbend Crocodile Farm
 Stephward Estate Exotic Nursery
 St Micheals on Sea Beach
 Aliwal Shoal
 Umtamvuna Nature Reserve
 Wild Waves Water Park

Towns 
The main towns or places in the Kwazulu-Natal South Coast includes:

Lower South Coast

 Boboyi
 Hibberdene
 Izingolweni
 Izotsha
 Margate
 Murchison
 Paddock
 Port Edward
 Port Shepstone
 Ramsgate
 Shelly Beach
 Southbroom
 St Faith's
 Uvongo

Upper South Coast

 Amahlongwa

Amandawe
Bazley Beach
Dududu
Ifafa Beach
KwaCele
Mtwalume
Park Rynie
Pennington
Scottburgh
Sezela
Umzinto

Harding and Surroundings
 Harding
Weza

Transport

Road 

The region is connected by the N2, R61, R102 and R612.

- The N2 links to Durban, Richards Bay and Ermelo in the north and Mthatha, East London, Gqeberha, Garden Route and Cape Town in the south-west.

- The R61 links to Mthatha, Graaf-Reinet and Beaufort West.

- The R102 links to Durban, KwaDukuza and Empangeni.

The N2 runs parallel on the coast from Port Shepstone and northwards and inland from Port Shepstone to Kokstad and westwards to Cape Town. The largest traffic volumes pass along the N2 towards Port Shepstone, and further towards Kokstad, as well as the R61 from Port Shepstone towards Port Edward. Large volumes of traffic also pass along the R612 from Park Rynie to Ixopo, and the road from Umtentweni to St Faith’s.

The N2 and R61 run as the "South Coast Toll Road" between Hibberdene and Southbroom and includes three toll plazas: Izotsha Ramp Plaza (Shelly Beach), Oribi Toll Plaza (Port Shepstone) and the Umtentweni Ramp Plaza (Port Shepstone).

An alternative route to the N2/R61 Toll Route for commuters and travelers is the R102 between Port Shepstone and Hibberdene and the R620 between Port Shepstone and Southbroom.

Air 

The South Coast is served by Margate Airport which currently has flights to Johannesburg operated by CemAir.
A larger alternative is King Shaka International Airport, north of Durban which has flights to other domestic destinations as well as international destinations such as Doha, Dubai, Istanbul and Harare.

Media

Newspaper
The newspapers in the KZN South Coast are the South Coast Herald, South Coast Fever and South Coast Sun.

Radio
In terms of radio, East Coast Radio and Ukhozi FM are the main radio stations mainly serving the whole province of KwaZulu-Natal.

References

content://0@media/external/file/37900

KwaZulu-Natal South Coast
Coasts of South Africa